Polirom or Editura Polirom ("Polirom" Publishing House) is a Romanian publishing house with a tradition of publishing classics of international literature and also various titles in the fields of social sciences, such as psychology, sociology and anthropology. The company was founded in February 1995. The first title published by Polirom was For Europe. In 2008, the company published 700 new titles, in a range of over 70 collections ranging from self-help to modern classics such as Robert Musil's The Man Without Qualities and from text books to "chick-lit". 

Polirom claims to be Romania's most profitable publisher as well as the publisher with the highest turn-over. It now has four major offices in Romania, including Bucharest.

References

External links
 Polirom homepage

1995 establishments in Romania
Mass media in Iași
Economy of Iași
Book publishing companies of Romania
Publishing companies established in 1995